Van Meter is a city in Dallas County, Iowa, United States, situated along the Raccoon River. The population was 1,484 at the time of the 2020 census. Van Meter is part of the Des Moines–West Des Moines Metropolitan Statistical Area.

History
Van Meter was laid out as a town in 1869. The city was named for Jacob Rhodes Van Meter and his family, Dutch settlers from Meteren, the Netherlands. Van Meter was incorporated on December 29, 1877.

The Van Meter Visitor
In September and October 1903, there were multiple instances of people claiming to have seen a winged, bat-like creature in and around Van Meter. The roughly nine-foot-tall being, which has since been dubbed the Van Meter Visitor, was reported to be able to shoot light from the horn situated on its forehead and be unaffected by bullets. Clarence Dunn, one of the witnesses, had even made a plaster cast of three-toed footprints it left behind. A smaller, similar being sometimes accompanied it. After a community-led confrontation, the being disappeared after about four days, supposedly into the nearby coal mine. Claims of witnessing bat-like creatures or phenomena have continued, including into the 2010s.

To commemorate the sightings, a Van Meter Visitor Festival transpires annually around the anniversary of the events.

Geography
Van Meter's longitude and latitude coordinates in decimal form are 41.531505, -93.955338).

Van Meter is situated west of Des Moines, just south of Interstate 80.

Demographics

2010 census
As of the census of 2010, there were 1,016 people, 382 households, and 280 families residing in the city. The racial makeup of the city was 97.9% White, 0.2% African American, 0.2% Native American, 0.6% Asian, and 1.1% from two or more races. Hispanic or Latino of any race were 0.6% of the population.

There were 382 households, of which 45.8% had children under the age of 18 living with them, 51.3% were married couples living together, 14.4% had a female householder with no husband present, 7.6% had a male householder with no wife present, and 26.7% were non-families. 22.3% of all households were made up of individuals, and 6.8% had someone living alone who was 65 years of age or older. The average household size was 2.66 and the average family size was 3.09.

The median age in the city was 35.5 years. 31.7% of residents were under the age of 18; 5.9% were between the ages of 18 and 24; 27.4% were from 25 to 44; 26.4% were from 45 to 64; and 8.7% were 65 years of age or older. The gender makeup of the city was 49.5% male and 50.5% female.

2000 census
As of the census of 2000, there were 866 people, 326 households, and 237 families residing in the city. The racial makeup of the city was 98.15% White, 0.23% African American, 0.69% Asian, 0.23% Pacific Islander, 0.23% from other races, and 0.46% from two or more races. Hispanic or Latino of any race were 1.39% of the population.

There were 326 households, out of which 41.1% had children under the age of 18 living with them, 59.2% were married couples living together, 11.3% had a female householder with no husband present, and 27.0% were non-families. 20.9% of all households were made up of individuals, and 3.7% had someone living alone who was 65 years of age or older. The average household size was 2.66 and the average family size was 3.13.

In the city, the population was spread out, with 30.5% under the age of 18, 6.8% from 18 to 24, 33.4% from 25 to 44, 21.4% from 45 to 64, and 8.0% who were 65 years of age or older. The median age was 35 years. For every 100 females, there were 92.0 males. For every 100 females age 18 and over, there were 88.1 males.

The median income for a household in the city was $50,625, and the median income for a family was $59,000. Males had a median income of $37,895 versus $26,023 for females. The per capita income for the city was $20,272. About 0.8% of families and 2.7% of the population were below the poverty line, including none of those under age 18 and 6.4% of those age 65 or over.

Arts and culture
The Bob Feller Museum opened on June 10, 1995, in honor of Bob Feller, a National Baseball Hall of Fame pitcher and a native of Van Meter.

On November 11, 2006, Veterans Day, ground was broken for an Iowa Veterans Cemetery at a site located near Van Meter.  Iowa Governor Tom Vilsack was among those who helped dedicate the cemetery. On November 11, 2018, a Freedom Rock was unveiled at the Iowa Veterans Cemetery.

Education
The Van Meter Community School District operates local public schools.

Notable people

Myrtle Aydelotte, nurse, professor, and hospital administrator
Derek Benz, science fiction author, The Revenge of the Shadow King.
Bob Feller,  Major League Baseball pitcher and member of Baseball Hall of Fame; born in Van Meter
David Young, former  U.S. Representative for

References

External links

 
City of Van Meter official website

Cities in Dallas County, Iowa
Cities in Iowa
Des Moines metropolitan area
1869 establishments in Iowa
Populated places established in 1869